The 2021 All-Ireland Senior Football Championship Final was the 134th final of the All-Ireland Senior Football Championship and the culmination of the 2021 All-Ireland Senior Football Championship. The match was played at Croke Park in Dublin on 11 September 2021. It was originally scheduled for 28 August but had to be postponed by two weeks when the – semi-final was postponed due to a COVID-19 outbreak.

Ulster champions Tyrone took on Connacht champions Mayo, in what was their first ever meeting in a final, winning their 4th title after a 2–14 to 0–15 win. Mayo lost their 11th consecutive final since 1989, losing 6 finals in 9 years, with this latest defeat on an identical scoreline to 2020, when Mayo lost to Dublin.

The game was televised nationally on RTÉ2 as part of The Saturday Game live programme, presented by Joanne Cantwell from the outdoor COVID-19 pandemic-proofed studio at Croke Park, with analysis from Kevin McStay, Seán Cavanagh and Pat Spillane. Match commentary was provided by Ger Canning, assisted by Tomás Ó Sé. The game was also televised internationally by Sky Sports.

Background
 were aiming to win their fourth title and first All-Ireland since 1951. Since then, they had lost ten finals (1989, 1996, 1997, 2004, 2006, 2012, 2013, 2016, 2017, 2020).
 appeared in their seventh final, winning on three occasions in 2003, 2005 and 2008.
This final was the fifth to be contested by county teams from Connacht and Ulster, the other finals were 1925 (Galway beat Cavan), 1943 (Roscommon beat Cavan), 1948 (Cavan beat Mayo) and 2012 (Donegal beat Mayo).

Paths to the final

Mayo

Tyrone

Pre-match

Officials
Cavan's Joe McQuillan was the referee for the final. He was previously in charge of finals in 2011, 2013, and 2017.

Meath played Tyrone in the All-Ireland Minor Football Championship final which took place on 28 August, two weeks before the senior final. Meath won the game on a 1–12 to 1–11 scoreline.

Unlike 2020, President Michael D. Higgins attended the final, with no official greeting of the players due to COVID-19.

Match

Summary
In front of a crowd of 41,150 fans (reduced to 50% capacity due to COVID-19), the match began with Mayo's Aidan O'Shea claiming the throw-in and giving a direct ball into Tommy Conroy who kicked the opening score at 16 seconds. Mayo, being the slight favourites, led by 0–02 to Tyrone's 0–01 by the sixth minute.

At half time, the score was at 0–10 – 0–08, with Tyrone leading by two points. The second half saw Tyrone score two goals from substitute Cathal McShane and Darren McCurry. Mayo were not able to avail of three other goal scoring opportunities, including a penalty missed by Ryan O'Donoghue.

Mayo went on to have Matthew Ruane red-carded after an altercation with Tyrone midfielder Conn Kilpatrick. The victory was first and foremost a tribute to the Ulster champions' defending as a team. For Mayo, this latest defeat came on an identical scoreline to 2020 and meant the team had lost one third of the total number of All-Ireland SFC finals played since 1989.

Details

Post-match
Mayo's curse at All-Ireland finals continued with the county losing 11 consecutive finals, now having lost a third of all All-Ireland football finals played since 1989, with this latest defeat on an identical scoreline to 2020, when Mayo lost to Dublin. Pat Spillane, referring to Mayo's long losing streak in All-Ireland SFC finals, quoted Samuel Beckett on television afterwards.

Mayo players Aidan O'Shea and Lee Keegan broke an unwanted record of most All-Ireland football final appearances without winning (6), with the duo losing 6 finals in 9 years (2012, 2013, 2016, 2017, 2020 and 2021).

Conor McKenna became the fourth former AFL player to win the Sam Maguire Cup.

Brian Dooher became the fifth manager to win an All-Ireland Senior Football Championship after earlier captaining his county to victory in the same competition (and the first since Páidí Ó Sé in 1997).

Notes

References

Final
All-Ireland Senior Football Championship Final, 2021
All-Ireland Senior Football Championship Finals
Final All-Ireland Football
Mayo county football team matches
Tyrone county football team matches
All-Ireland Senior Football